Jean-Kome Loglo (born 24 June 1975) is a Togolese tennis player.

Loglo has a career high ATP singles ranking of 1111 achieved on 1 March 1999. He also has a career high ATP doubles ranking of 908 achieved on 22 February 1999.

Loglo represented Togo at the Davis Cup, where he has a W/L record of 29–28.

References

External links

1975 births
Living people
Togolese male tennis players
Sportspeople from Lomé
21st-century Togolese people